Luka Prelevic (born 7 September 1995), is an Australian-born New Zealand professional footballer who plays as an attacking midfielder for Pascoe Vale FC.

Club career

In 2015, Prelevic was a member of the inaugural Melbourne City NPL squad and won the NPL 1 Rising Star award for the league's best player under the age of 20 that season.

He signed for Pascoe Vale ahead of the 2016 NPL season.

International career

Prelevic was a member of the New Zealand U-23s squad at the 2015 Pacific Games.

He received his first call-up for the All Whites as a late inclusion to 2016 OFC Nations Cup squad to replace the injured Shane Smeltz.
He made his senior debut in New Zealand's opening match of that tournament, on 28 May against Fiji.

References

External links

Living people
1995 births
New Zealand association footballers
New Zealand international footballers
Australian soccer players
Association football midfielders
Port Melbourne SC players
National Premier Leagues players
2016 OFC Nations Cup players